Alastor: Book of Angels Volume 21 is an album by violist and multi-instrumentalist Eyvind Kang which was released in 2014 on John Zorn's Tzadik Records as part of Zorn's Book of Angels Series.

Reception
Alarm reviewer Scott Morrow stated "Though Kang generally skews towards classical, chamber, and ambient, his take on Zorn’s hand-picked selections is a surprising and gorgeous collision of styles."

Track listing 
All compositions by John Zorn.

 "Hakem" - 5:37
 "Samchia" - 3:49
 "Hakha" - 3:18
 "Jetrel" - 5:32
 "Variel" - 4:12
 "Loquel" - 3:15
 "Rachiel" - 3:49
 "Barael" - 3:22
 "Sakriel" - 7:08
 "Uriron" - 4:42

Personnel 
Eyvind Kang - electric bass, guitars, janggu, kacapi, kamancheh, Korg synthesizer, Moog synthesizer, oud, percussion, piano, setar, sitar, viola, violin, voice
Skerik - tenor saxophone
Hans Teuber - clarinets, flutes, tenor saxophone
Cuong Vu - trumpet
Emma Ashbrook - bassoon
Josiah Boothby - French horn
Taina Karr - English horn, oboe
Randall Dunn - Moog synthesizer, voice
Hidayat Honari - tar
Maria Scherer Wilson, William Smith - cello
Soyeon Park - geomungo
JungAh Song - gayageum
Shahzad Ismaily, Moriah Neils, Jacob Yackshaw - bass 
Dave Abramson - drums, percussion
Tor Dietrichson - bongos, congas, clave, guiro, tabla, triangle
Hyeonhee Park - janggu, kkwaenggwari
Maya Dunietz, Jessika Kenney - voice

References 

2014 albums
Tzadik Records albums
Eyvind Kang albums
Book of Angels albums